The Memphis Eclipses were a Negro league baseball team that played in the Southern League of Colored Base Ballists in 1886. They were located in Memphis, Tennessee, and, along with the Memphis Eurekas, were one of two Memphis teams in the league.

References 

Negro league baseball teams
Baseball teams established in 1886
Baseball teams disestablished in 1886
E
Professional baseball teams in Tennessee
1886 establishments in Tennessee
1886 disestablishments in Tennessee
Defunct baseball teams in Tennessee